Silver Gate may refer to:

 Silver Gate (Diocletian's Palace), Split, Croatia
 Silver Gate, Montana, US
 Silver Gate (Wyoming), a mountain pass in Wyoming, US

See also
Silvergate (disambiguation)